Joel Trussell is a director and artist based in Los Angeles, California. He was an executive producer at Disney Television Animation for the Disney XD show Pickle and Peanut which he helped develop alongside the creator Noah Z. Jones.

Before Disney, Trussell directed the 20 episode, award-winning, animated series Electric City which is created, written by and starring Tom Hanks.

Trussell is additionally well known for directing several award-winning music videos, and many animated segments for Yo Gabba Gabba! on Nickelodeon. In 2008 he was selected by Mike Judge to direct the intro for The Animation Show.

Pictoplasma has published his work in their Character Encyclopedia, and two collections of their Characters in Motion (2&3).  He was selected as a speaker at their 2011 event in New York City and the 2012 event in Berlin.

Music videos

References

External links
Joel Trussell's website
 Joel Trussell on Twitter
 Interview from 2012 with Cartoon Brew

American music video directors
Living people
Year of birth missing (living people)
Disney Television Animation people